Meirionnydd Nant Conwy was a constituency represented in the House of Commons of the Parliament of the United Kingdom. It elected one Member of Parliament (MP) by the first past the post system of election.

The Meirionnydd Nant Conwy Welsh Assembly constituency was created with the same boundaries in 1999.

History
The constituency was created in 1983, largely replacing the ancient constituency of Merioneth, and was abolished in 2010. For the entire period of its existence, it was represented by Plaid Cymru, and was generally regarded as a safe seat. It had the lowest population of any constituency in England or Wales, and also had the second highest proportion of Welsh-speaking voters.

Boundaries
Meirionnydd Nant Conwy consisted of Merionethshire and part of the Conwy valley. This was a mainly rural area containing small towns and villages such as Dolgellau, Blaenau Ffestiniog, Bala, Betws-y-Coed, and Llanrwst.

Boundary review
Following its review of parliamentary representation in Wales, the Boundary Commission for Wales abolished this constituency. It was replaced mostly by Dwyfor Meirionnydd and in part by Aberconwy. These new constituencies were first fought at the 2010 general election.

Members of Parliament
From 1983 to 1992 the constituency was represented by Dafydd Elis Thomas of Plaid Cymru, who now represents Dwyfor Meirionnydd in the National Assembly for Wales and is its former Presiding Officer. The constituency was represented at its abolition by Elfyn Llwyd, also of Plaid Cymru.

Elections

Elections in the 1980s

Elections in the 1990s

Elections in the 2000s

See also
List of parliamentary constituencies in Clwyd
List of parliamentary constituencies in Gwynedd

Notes and references

Historic parliamentary constituencies in North Wales
Merionethshire
Constituencies of the Parliament of the United Kingdom established in 1983
Constituencies of the Parliament of the United Kingdom disestablished in 2010